The Israel National Baseball Team represents Israel in international competitions. It is managed by Israeli-American former Major League Baseball World Series champion, World Baseball Classic champion, four-time All Star, and Olympian Ian Kinsler.

At the 2017 WBC, Team Israel came in 6th. In 2022, Israel was ranked 20th in the world. The Israel national baseball team competed at the 2020 Summer Olympics in 2021, where it beat Mexico and finished 5th. 

The team competed in the 2023 World Baseball Classic in March 2023 in Miami, Florida, against Team Puerto Rico, Team Dominican Republic, Team Venezuela, and Team Nicaragua. Among the players who played for the team were All Star outfielder Joc Pederson and starting pitcher Dean Kremer.

History
In the 1970s American immigrants started playing baseball in Israel. In December 1986, the Israel Association of Baseball (IAB) was formed as a non-profit organization to develop baseball in Israel. Israel has baseball teams in all age groups from 10 to 30.

In 2015, Israel senior national team pitcher Dean Kremer became the first Israeli to be selected in the Major League Baseball draft.  He was picked by the San Diego Padres in the 38th round. Kremer opted to fulfill his college commitment, and play for the UNLV Rebels baseball team. After playing for the Rebels for the 2016 season, Kremer was drafted by the Los Angeles Dodgers in the 14th round of the 2016 draft. In 2019, Kremer reached Class AAA for the first time, pitching for the Norfolk Tides of the International League. In 2020, Kremer made his debut for the Baltimore Orioles, becoming the first Israeli citizen to pitch in the major leagues.

Prior to the 2017 World Baseball Classic (WBC), Israel was the 41st-ranked national baseball team in the world (and ranked 16th in Europe). After its performance in the 2017 WBC, in which Team Israel came in 6th, the team was ranked 19th in the world (and 4th in Europe). The most recent ranking was released in 2022, with Israel ranked 20th in the world. The Israel national baseball team that competed at the 2020 Summer Olympics was composed mostly of Israeli-American Jews with four Israeli-born players.

In 2019 Israel won the European Baseball B-Pool competition, with a 5–0 record. It then won the best-of-three 2019 European Qualification Playoff Series, with a 2–0 record. Consequently, it qualified for the 2019 European Baseball Championship 12-team tournament in Germany, where it came in fourth. As one of the top five teams in the Championship, it thereby moved on to compete in the Africa/Europe 2020 Olympic Qualification tournament.  It won that tournament, and thus qualified to be one of six national teams that competed in 2021 in baseball at the 2020 Tokyo Olympics.

At the Olympics in 2021 the team faced Japan, Mexico, South Korea, the United States, and the Dominican Republic. Israel beat Mexico but finished 5th, after losing to the Dominican Republic 7-6 in the Round 2 repechage. The team will next compete in the 2023 World Baseball Classic.

The senior national team manager is Ian Kinsler.

Results and fixtures

The following is a list of professional baseball match results currently active in the latest version of the WBSC World Rankings, as well as any future matches that have been scheduled.

Legend

2019

2021

2023

Current roster

2023 World Baseball Classic

Competitions

World Baseball Classic

2013 World Baseball Classic 

Team Israel competed in the September 2012 Qualifier Round 1, in Jupiter, Florida, against Spain, France, and South Africa. Israel won easily in their first game. Israel then beat Spain in the winner's bracket. Spain then eliminated South Africa to earn a rematch with Israel, in the final game. Spain won the winner-take-all final game, 9–7 in 10 innings, to advance to the main tournament.

2017 World Baseball Classic

In September 2016, Team Israel competed in the 2017 Qualifier 4 round. Colorado Rockies coach Jerry Weinstein served as the manager. Israel's roster included 20 MLB-affiliated minor leaguers, making up 86% of the team, more than any other team in the qualifiers even before including recent Major Leaguers.

Israel won all three of their games in the qualifier, beating Great Britain twice and Brazil once. With the win, Israel advanced to play in Pool A in South Korea in March 2017, against South Korea, Taiwan, and the Netherlands.

Prior to the start of the 2017 tournament, ESPN considered Israel, ranked 41st in the world, to be the biggest underdog in the tournament, referring to them as the "Jamaican bobsled team of the WBC". Israel began the round robin tournament with wins against world # 3 Korea and world # 4 Chinese Taipei, and world # 9 Netherlands. Team Israel's first round performance afforded it a spot in the second round, in Pool E in Japan, and ensured its participation in the 2021 World Baseball Classic tournament. Ryan Lavarnway was named Pool A MVP.

In the first game of the second round, Team Israel beat Team Cuba (world # 5) by a score of 4−1.  Israel lost the next two games, to the Netherlands and world # 1 Japan, and came in third in Pool E.

In 2018 a documentary was released entitled Heading Home: The Tale of Team Israel, which covered the experience of Team Israel at the 2017 World Baseball Classic.

2023 World Baseball Classic
Team Israel will compete in the 2023 World Baseball Classic in March 11-15, 2023. It will play in Miami, Florida. Israel will face Team Puerto Rico, Team Dominican Republic, Team Venezuela, and Team Nicaragua. 

American-Israeli Ian Kinsler, a former Major League All Star and two-time Gold Glove winner, and Israeli Olympian, will manage the team. Among the players who have committed to play for the team are All Star outfielder Joc Pederson, outfielder Alex Dickerson, catcher Garrett Stubbs, and American-Israelis catcher Ryan Lavarnway, infielder Danny Valencia, and infielder Ty Kelly, along with prospects Matt Mervis (who in 2022 he led Minor League Baseball in RBIs and was third with 36 home runs), Zack Gelof, and Spencer Horwitz. Pitchers who will be on the team include Israeli-American Dean Kremer, Richard Bleier, Robert Stock, Jake Bird, and American-Israelis Jake Fishman, Zack Weiss, and Bubby Rossman, while Scott Effross was slated to be on the team but injured his arm.

Others who may possibly join Team Israel include All Star pitcher Max Fried, pitcher Noah Davis, pitcher Kenny Rosenberg, and outfielder Mike Moustakas. Third baseman All Star Alex Bregman has chosen not to play in the WBC, first baseman Rowdy Tellez has chosen to play for Team Mexico, and Adam Ottavino has chosen to play for Team Italy. Gold Glove outfielder Harrison Bader, outfielder Kevin Pillar, and pitcher Eli Morgan originally intended to play for the team, but at the end of the day will not play.

Brad Ausmus will be one of the team's coaches. He is a former Team Israel manager, has managed in the major leagues for five years, and during his 18-year playing career won three Gold Glove Awards for his defense. Kevin Youkilis will be the team's hitting coach. In his 10-year major league career, he won two World Series titles with the Boston Red Sox, was a three-time All Star, and won a Gold Glove Award.  Jerry Narron, who in his 30 year career has been as a manager or coach with eight different major league teams and been the third base coach for Team Israel at the 2017 World Baseball Classic qualifier, will also serve as a coach for the team.

European Baseball Championship

2019 European Baseball Championship
Team Israel won the 2019 European Baseball Championship - B-Pool in early July 2019 in Blagoevgrad, Bulgaria, winning all five of its games. It thus advanced to the playoffs against Team Lithuania in the 2019 Playoff Series at the end of July 2019 for the last qualifying spot for the 2019 European Baseball Championship. Israel won the best-of-three playoff series 2–0, and thereby qualified for the 2019 European Baseball Championship.

In preparation for possible qualification by Israel to play baseball at the 2020 Summer Olympics, 10 American baseball players made aliyah in 2018 in order to qualify under the citizenship requirement for the 2019 European Baseball Championships and the Olympics. The players were Corey Baker, Eric Brodkowitz, Gabe Cramer, Blake Gailen, Alex Katz, Jonathan de Marte, Jon Moscot, Joey Wagman, Zack Weiss, and Jeremy Wolf (who lives in Tel Aviv). They were followed in 2019 by Jeremy Bleich, Ty Kelly, Nick Rickles, Danny Valencia, and Ben Wanger.

In Round 1 of the 2019 European Baseball Championship, Israel went 4–1 (defeating world # 18 the Czech Republic, Sweden, Germany, and Great Britain while losing to the Netherlands). The team thereby advanced to the Championship's eight-team playoffs, with Mitch Glasser leading all Championship batters in runs with 7, and Blake Gailen tied with Germany's Marco Cardoso for the lead in hits, with 8. In the Championship playoffs, Israel defeated Team France in the quarterfinals, lost to Team Italy in the semi-finals, and came in fourth. In the Championship, Joey Wagman led all pitchers with a 0.00 ERA over 10.2 innings.

2021 European Baseball Championship; silver medal
At the 2021 European Baseball Championship held September 12–19, 2021, in Turin, Italy, Israel won the silver medal. Third baseman Assaf Lowengart led the Championship with 13 RBIs and tied for the lead in home runs with four, second baseman Mitch Glasser was 5th with an on base percentage of .615, and shortstop Ty Kelly was 5th with seven walks. Joey Wagman led the Championship with 18 strikeouts and tied for the lead with 16 innings pitched, and Ben Wanger tied for the lead with two wins.

Olympics

2020 Olympics

Because Team Israel finished in the top five in the 2019 European Baseball Championship, it earned the right to participate in the 2020 Olympics qualifiers. That round robin tournament took place in Italy between September 18 and 22, 2019. As the winner of that tournament it qualified to be one of the six national teams that competed at the 2020 Summer Olympics in Tokyo.

The Israeli team started strong at the September 2019 Africa/Europe Qualifying Event, by defeating all three 2019 European Baseball Championship medalists - world # 8 Netherlands, world # 16 Italy, and Spain, before losing to the Czech Republic. In its final game, Israel beat South Africa 11–1 in a game that was stopped in the 7th inning due to the mercy rule. Team Israel won the tournament with a 4–1 record. It thereby qualified to be one of six national baseball teams that competed in the 2020 Summer Olympics in Tokyo.  First baseman/DH Danny Valencia batted .375 and led the tournament in runs (7), home runs (3), RBIs (9), walks (5), and slugging percentage (1.000), and starting pitcher Joey Wagman tied for the tournament lead with two wins, and led in complete games (1) and strikeouts (14) as he had an 0.56 ERA in 16 innings.

Every member of the 24-member Team Israel that competed to qualify in the Olympics was Israeli, with four of the players native-born. The others made aliyah to Israel, under Israel's Law of Return, which gives anyone with a Jewish parent, grandparent, or spouse the right to return to Israel and be granted Israeli citizenship. Native-born Israeli team member Shlomo Lipetz observed: "There is no other country like Israel that carries an identity as it does with Jews around the world. We’re not the only team here with citizens that don't live in the country. There were other teams like Spain that had 22 Venezuelans and two Spaniards. But they didn't have that connection. This wasn't just a group of people, All-Stars who came together. It was people who all had a Bar Mitzvah. We were joking around that everyone will post their Bar Mitzvah photo."

At the 2020 Olympics in Tokyo in the summer of 2021, Israel beat Mexico and finished fifth after going 1-4 and  losing to the Dominican Republic 7-6 in the Round 2 Repechage. The Israel national baseball team that competed at the 2020 Summer Olympics was composed mostly of American Jews who were dual American-Israeli citizens, in addition to four Israeli-born players. Danny Valencia tied for the lead in the Olympics with three home runs, tied for second with six runs and seven RBIs, and had the fourth-best slugging percentage (.778), Ryan Lavarnway had the 5th-best slugging percentage (.700), and Mitch Glasser's .474 on base percentage was 5th-best at the Games.

Player records

Most capped players since 2016

Most hits since 2016

Most runs scored since 2016

Most home runs since 2016

Most runs batted in since 2016

Past rosters

2020 Olympics

2017 World Baseball Classic

International tournament results

World Baseball Classic

European Baseball Championship

Other competitions
European Under-21 Baseball Championship

 2006 : 9th
 2016 : 4th (host nation)

European Juveniles Baseball Championship

 2006 : 3rd
 2007 : 7th
 2012 : 4th

European Junior Baseball Championship

2019 :

See also

Baseball in Israel
Israel Baseball League
Sports in Israel

References

National baseball teams in Europe
 
Baseball
National